Tal Shefi (Hebrew: טל שפי; born April 28, 1967) is an American-Israeli film editor, director and screenwriter.

Biography 
Shefi was born in Palo Alto, California, and grew up in Tel Aviv, Israel. Her parents are Hannah Ezrati, an immigrant from Saloniki, and Adam Shefi. 

Shefi studied theater at Telma Yelin High School and at the Avshalom Democratic School. She then studied film at the Beit Zvi film school, and completed additional courses at the New School of Visual Arts in New York, and at AFI in Los Angeles. 

Between 1999-2002, Shefi was co-founder of the film department and lead editing instructor at the Emek Yizrael College. Between 2002-2009, she lived in Goa, India, and there created her first film as a director, Not Your Life. She moved to India with her partner and their daughter, Kaya, then age 8. Kaya got involved in a local boxing club, and Shefi followed some of the girls on their journey in this non-traditional sports branch for the film. Kaya was home-schooled during this time, and also completed correspondence courses. They returned to Israel when she was 15. Since 2009, Shefi teaches at Jump Cut, a school for film editors and animators. 

Shefi is a mentor and lector for various film funds and festivals, including DocAviv, Gesher Film Fund, and the Bernstein Foundation.

Filmography

Awards

See also
 List of female film and television directors

References

External links 
 

Israeli film editors
Israeli women film directors
1967 births
Living people
Film people from Tel Aviv
Israeli female screenwriters